Kim Min-gyu (14 October 1977 – 3 April 2017) was a South Korean para table tennis player. He won a bronze medal at the 2012 Summer Paralympics.

He was found dead in 2017. He lived alone and drank alcohol the night before his death.

References

1977 births
2017 deaths
Table tennis players at the 2012 Summer Paralympics
Medalists at the 2012 Summer Paralympics
South Korean male table tennis players
Paralympic bronze medalists for South Korea
Paralympic table tennis players of South Korea
Paralympic medalists in table tennis
Sportspeople from South Gyeongsang Province
People from Jinju
21st-century South Korean people